The Clonmacnoise and West Offaly Railway was a narrow-gauge railway and former tourist attraction in the Midlands of Ireland. Primarily built as an industrial line for hauling newly cut peat, this  narrow-gauge railway was operated by the peat-harvesting company Bord na Móna and conveyed visitors over a 9-km line running through Blackwater Bog, near Shannonbridge, County Offaly. A small diesel locomotive hauled a single 53-seat passenger coach.

The railway was an important tourist attraction in County Offaly. However, it closed permanently at the end of 2008 as operation of the line was interfering with the heavy flow of peat traffic bound for the Electricity Supply Board's West Offaly Power Generation Station. Given the historic importance of peat as an indigenous Irish fuel, the railway and associated visitor services aimed to show visitors how milled peat is produced and transported to power stations, and Bord na Móna is investigating the provision of an alternative tourism facility for the area.

Somewhat confusingly, the railway was also sometimes known (and described on road signs) as the Blackwater Railway, the Shannonbridge Bog Railway, and the Bog Railway.

See also
Clonmacnoise
List of narrow gauge railways in Ireland

References

External links
Railways of Bord na Móna
The Bog Railway at About.com
The Bog Train tour

3 ft gauge railways in Ireland
Railway companies disestablished in 2008
Transport in County Offaly